Tregew is a hamlet north of Flushing, Cornwall, England, United Kingdom.

Bartholomew Sulivan, the naval officer and hydrographer, was born here in 1810.

References

Hamlets in Cornwall